The 2002 season of the Belgian Football League (BFL) is the regular season played in the Belgium. The Brussels Tigers won Belgian Bowl XV against the Antwerp Diamonds by a score of 18-16. This was the last time a team of the LFFAB won the Belgian Bowl.

Regular season

Regular season standings
W = Wins, L = Losses, T = Ties, PCT = Winning Percentage, PF= Points For, PA = Points Against

 - clinched seed to the post season

Post season

References

American football in Belgium
BFL
BFL